was a Japanese noble and scholar of the late Nara period. He was the grandson of the sadaijin Isonokami no Maro and son of the chūnagon Isonokami no Otomaro.

Life 

In 761 he was also appointed vice-envoy to Tang dynasty China, but in the next year was replaced by Fujiwara no Tamaro without making the voyage over. In 763, he was appointed vice-minister in the Shikibu-shō.

Yakatsugu plotted with Fujiwara no Yoshitsugu, Ōtomo no Yakamochi, and Saeki no Imaemishi to overthrow the daijō-daijin and power of the day, Fujiwara no Nakamaro, but their plot was discovered. In 764, Yakatsugu was demoted to an assistant minister in the Dazaifu — until nine months later, when Nakamaro led his own failed rebellion.

Upon the death of Empress Shōtoku in 770, Yakatsugu aligned with Fujiwara no Nagate in supporting the future Emperor Kōnin as her successor. The appreciative new emperor continued to value him, and Yakatsugu was promoted to chūnagon in 771 and dainagon in 780, making him the third highest ranking figure in the daijō-kan after udaijin Ōnakatomi no Kiyomaro and naidaijin Fujiwara no Uona. During this period, he also held positions as head of the Dazaifu, shikibu-sho, Ministry of the Center, and Crown Prince's Quarters.

Personality 

Intelligent and quick on the uptake, Yakatsugu also possessed a fine appearance. His speech and behavior were calm and elegant.

A great lover of the Confucian classics and historical texts, he was familiar with a wide variety of books. He also liked to write, and was proficient in both cursive script and clerical script. He wrote kanshi, and was considered a leading scholar of his day along with Ōmi no Mifune. His works are included in the Keikokushū.

He built a temple called  on his former residence, and in a corner of the complex he established a library called . Here he made various texts available to the public, focusing primarily on non-Buddhist works. This is believed to have been Japan's first public library.

Genealogy 

Father: Isonokami no Otomaro
Mother: Unknown
Wife: Unknown
Son: 
Daughter: wife of

Notes

References 

723 births
781 deaths
People of Nara-period Japan
Buddhism in the Nara period